Egon Johnsson (6 December 1926 – 20 July 1985) was a Swedish professional footballer who played as a forward.

Nicknamed "Atom-Egon," he started off his career with GAIS in Sweden before signing with Stade Français in 1950. He then went on to represent RC Lens, FC Nancy, Lausanne Sports, and SC Toulon before finishing up his career with Yverdon Sport in Switzerland in 1962. A prolific goal scorer, Johnsson was the Ligue 2 top scorer during the 1951–52 and 1957–58 seasons.

Johnsson won two caps for the Sweden national team in 1949, and scored one goal. His last name is sometimes incorrectly listed as "Jönsson," "Jonsson," or "Johansson."

Club career

Early career 
Born in Höganäs, Johnsson began his footballing career with Öresunds BK before moving on to represent Utbynäs SK, Vårgårda IK, Höganäs BK, and Redbergslids IK until signing for the Allsvenskan club GAIS in 1948. While at GAIS, Johnsson helped the team finish third in the 1948–49 Allsvenskan by scoring 14 goals in 21 games. The following season, Johnsson scored 9 goals in 22 games as GAIS finished 5th. It was at GAIS that Johnsson earned the nickname "Atom-Egon," referring to his strong physique and powerful shooting skills.

Stade Français 
Johnsson signed for Stade Français in France ahead of the 1950–51 season of the French Division 1. Despite Johnsson's 12 goals in 33 games in his debut season, Stade Français was relegated after finishing last in the division. The following season Johnsson was the top scorer with 34 goals in 34 games as Stade Français won the 1951–52 French Division 2. Stade Français was once again relegated from the French Division 1 after the 1953–54 season. After half a season in the French Division 2, Johnsson left the club to sign for French Division 1 club RC Lens.

Lens 
Johnsson finished second with RC Lens in league play in both the 1955–56 and 1956–57 seasons, scoring the third most goals in the league in 1956–57 with 29 goals in 32 games. He was a part of the RC Lens team that finished second in the 1957 Coupe Charles Drago.

FC Nancy 
Johnsson signed for the French Division 2 club FC Nancy in 1957. Just like six years prior, Johnsson managed to become the French Division 2 top scorer, scoring 29 goals in 41 games during the 1957–58 season. Johnsson's goals helped FC Nancy finish at the top of the French Division 2 table, winning Johnsson his second division title and securing the club a spot in the next season's top flight. Johnsson left the club at the end of the season after only one year.

Lausanne Sports and return to France 
In 1958, Johnsson moved to Switzerland to play for Lausanne Sports in the Nationalliga A. He scored 18 goals in 34 goals for the Swiss club before leaving the club halfway into the 1959–60 season to return to France. Johnsson signed a contract with the French Division 1 team SC Toulon in early 1960. Once again he experienced relegation, as Toulon finished the season in the relegation zone of the 1959–60 French Division 1. However, Johnsson still had a prolific time at the club, scoring 9 goals in 17 games during the spring of 1960.

Return to Switzerland and retirement 
After only half a year in France, Johnsson returned to Switzerland to sign for the Nationalliga B club Yverdon-Sport FC. He spent two seasons with the club as a player-coach and scored 25 goals in 39 games before wrapping up his professional career to join the coaching staff at the Swiss third-tier club FC Martigny-Sports.

International career 
Johnson made his debut for the Sweden national team on 13 May 1949, scoring a goal on volley from 25 meters on a pass from Gunnar Gren in a 3–1 friendly win against England at Råsunda Stadium. This was Sweden's first ever victory against England. He won his second and final cap on 2 June 1949 in a 1950 FIFA World Cup qualifier against Ireland, which Sweden won 3–1.

Personal life 
Johnsson worked as a chiropractor after his footballing career, specializing in sports injuries. He died on 20 July 1985 at 58 years of age, after having battled an incurable disease.

Career statistics

Club

International 

Scores and results list Sweden's goal tally first, score column indicates score after Johnsson goal.

Honours 
Stade Français
 French Division 2: 1950–51

Nancy
 French Division 2: 1957–58
Individual
 French Division 2 top scorer: 1951–52, 1957–58

References 

Association football forwards
Swedish footballers
Sweden international footballers
Ligue 2 players
Ligue 1 players
GAIS players
RC Lens players
FC Nancy players
Stade Français (association football) players
People from Höganäs Municipality
Sportspeople from Skåne County